Juan José Beníquez Torres (born May 13, 1950) is a former center fielder in Major League Baseball who played for the Boston Red Sox, Texas Rangers, New York Yankees, Seattle Mariners, California Angels, Baltimore Orioles, Kansas City Royals and Toronto Blue Jays in all or parts of 17 seasons spanning 1971–1988. Listed at 5' 11" , 150 lb. , Beníquez batted and threw right-handed. He was born in San Sebastián, Puerto Rico.

Career
A valuable role player for a long time, Beníquez spent 17 years in the major leagues playing for eight different American League clubs. He started his career with the Red Sox in 1971, appearing at shortstop as a backup for Luis Aparicio in part of two seasons, and later was switched to center field. 

He appeared in the postseason three times, including the 1975 World Series with the Red Sox. 

A .274 career hitter, Beníquez hit 79 home runs with 610 runs and 476 RBI in 1,500 games played. After his major league career was over, he held the record for having played for eight American League teams.

Beníquez hit .359 while playing for the St. Lucie Legends of the Senior Professional Baseball Association in 1989.

Gallery

See also
 List of Major League Baseball players from Puerto Rico

Sources
, or Retrosheet, or SABR Biography Project

1950 births
Living people
Baltimore Orioles players
Boston Red Sox players
California Angels players
Cangrejeros de Santurce (baseball) players
Gold Glove Award winners
Kansas City Royals players
Liga de Béisbol Profesional Roberto Clemente outfielders
Louisville Colonels (minor league) players
Major League Baseball first basemen
Major League Baseball designated hitters
Major League Baseball outfielders
Major League Baseball players from Puerto Rico
Major League Baseball shortstops
Major League Baseball third basemen
New York Yankees players
Pawtucket Red Sox players
People from San Sebastián, Puerto Rico
Puerto Rican expatriate baseball players in Canada
Seattle Mariners players
St. Lucie Legends players
Texas Rangers players
Toronto Blue Jays players
Winston-Salem Red Sox players
Winter Haven Red Sox players